Dzień Na Żywo (eng. Day Live) is the hard-news daytime programming on Polish news channel TVN24. Two hosts present the news alternately every half an hour. The programme features newscasts, live reports with correspondents and talks with invited guests. It is presented by Anna Jędrzejowska, Anna Kalczyńska, Marta Kuligowska, Michał Cholewiński, Jakub Porada and Krzysztof Górlicki who hosts the weekend editions.

The team

Current hosts 
Joanna Kryńska
Igor Sokołowski
Justyna Sieklucka
Krzysztof Górlicki
Anna Seremak
Justyna Kosela

Former hosts 
(With current hosting position where applicable.) 
Beata Tadla (The Facts on TVN, The Facts After The Facts and The Facts in the Afternoon on TVN24)
Anita Werner (The Facts on TVN, The Facts After The Facts and The Facts in the Afternoon on TVN24)
Piotr Marciniak (The Facts on TVN, The Facts After The Facts and Babilon on TVN24)
Dagmara Kaczmarek-Szałkow (Poland and The World)
Marcin Żebrowski (You Get Up and You Know)
Piotr Jacoń (Day After Day)
Agata Tomaszewska (TVN24 reporter)
Jarosław Kuźniar (You Get Up and You Know)
Anna Kleina (left the channel)
Łukasz Grass (left the channel)
Joanna Kryńska (news on You Get Up and You Know)
Kacper Kaliszewski (left the channel)
Brygida Grysiak (TVN24 reporter)
Anna Jędrzejowska (15:00 Live)

References 

Polish television shows
2001 Polish television series debuts
2000s Polish television series
2010s Polish television series
2020s Polish television series
TVN24 original programming